Hubble Space Telescope instruments:
Wide Field and Planetary Camera
Wide Field and Planetary Camera 2
Wide Field Camera 3
Wide Field Camera, an instrument at Isaac Newton Telescope
Other Satellite instruments:
 Wide Field Camera, an instrument on the Cloud-Aerosol Lidar and Infrared Pathfinder Satellite Observations (CALIPSO)